.jm is the Internet country code top-level domain (ccTLD) for Jamaica.  Registrations are at the third level beneath the second level names com.jm, net.jm, org.jm, edu.jm, gov.jm, and mil.jm. Registrations are processed by hand rather than automatically, so registrants are asked to allow 30 days for the registrations to be completed. Updates to domain names (such as changes to nameservers) can only be authorized by the technical or registrant e-mail addresses.  Registration of .jm domains is handled by Mona Information Technology Services (MITS) at the University of the West Indies. Registration is free, although there has been some discussion about MITS making the service commercial in the coming years.

See also
Internet in Jamaica

References

External links
 IANA — .jm Domain Delegation Data
 .jm domain application form
 .jm domain application form (archived version)
 Mona Information Technology Services – The University of the West Indies at Mona, Jamaica (Jamaican domain names registrar)

Country code top-level domains
Communications in Jamaica
University of the West Indies
Computer-related introductions in 1991

sv:Toppdomän#J